The Sack Man (also called the Bag Man or Man with the Bag/Sack) is a figure similar to the bogeyman, portrayed as a man with a sack on his back who carries naughty children away.

Regional traditions 
Variants of this figure appear all over the world, particularly in Latin countries, such as Spain, Portugal, Italy (where he is known as the vecchio col sacco ("the old man with the sack"), and the countries of Latin America, where it is referred to as el "Hombre del costal", el hombre del saco, or in Portuguese, o homem do saco (all of which mean "the sack/bag man"), and Eastern Europe. Similar legends are found in Haiti and some countries in Asia.

Iberia and Latin America 
In Spain, el hombre del saco is usually depicted as a mean and impossibly ugly and skinny old man who eats the misbehaving children he collects. The crime of Gádor gave rise to this term because the kidnapers used a gunny sack to carry with the children. In Brazil, o homem do saco is portrayed as a tall and imposing adult male, usually in the form of a vagrant, who carries a sack on his back, and collects mean disobedient children for nefarious purposes. In Chile, Argentina and particularly in the Southern and Austral Zones, is mostly known as "El Viejo del Saco" ("The old man with the bag") who walks around the neighbourhood every day around supper time. This character is not considered or perceived as a mythical or fantastic creature by children. Instead, he is recognised as an insane murderer that somehow has been accepted by society which allows him to take a child that has been given to him willingly by disappointed parents or any child that is not home by sundown or supper time. In Honduras and Mexico, misbehaving children fear "El Roba Chicos", or child-snatcher, which is very similar to "Hombre del Saco".

Eastern Europe and the Caucasus 
In Armenia and Georgia, children are threatened by the "Bag Man" who carries a bag and kidnaps those who do not behave. In Hungary, the local bogeyman, the mumus, is known as zsákos ember, literally "the person with a sack". In Poland children are frightened by the bebok, babok, or bobok or who is also portrayed as a man with a sack. In the Czech Republic and Slovakia, a similar creature is known: bubák. It's a creature without a typical form, connected with darkness or scary places, making children fear but not taking them away usually. The character of čert, the devil, is used for that instead ("Don't be naughty or čert will take you away!"). In Russia, Ukraine and Belarus, buka ("бука"), Babay ("бабай") or Babayka ("бабайка") is used to keep children in bed or stop them from misbehaving. 'Babay' means "old man" in Tatar. Children are told that "Babay" is an old man with a bag or a monster, usually hiding under the bed, and that he will take them away if they misbehave (though he is sometimes depicted as having no set appearance).

Asia 
In North India, children are sometimes threatened with the Bori Baba or "Father Sack" who carries a sack in which he places children he captures. A similar being, "Abu i Kees", literally "The Man with a Bag", appears in Lebanon. In Turkey, Kharqyt ( means "Sack Man"- also called Öcü, Böcü or Torbalı) is portrayed as a man with a sack on his back who carries naughty children away to eat or sell them.

In Korea,  an old man who carries a mesh sack to put his kidnapped children in, thus, "Old Man with a Sack".

In Sri Lanka, among the Sinhalese people, elders frighten misbehaving children with Goni Billa, (translates roughly as "sack kidnapper") a scary man carrying a sack who arrives day or night to capture and keep children.

Africa 
In the Western Cape folklore of South Africa, Antjie Somers is a Bogeyman who catches naughty children in a bag slung over his shoulder. Although the name is that of a female, Antjie Somers is traditionally a male figure (often an escaped slave who fled persecution by cross-dressing).

In association with Christmas 
Several countries contrast their version of the sack man with the benign sack carrier Father Christmas. In the Netherlands and Flanders, Zwarte Piet (Dutch for "Black Pete") is a servant of Sinterklaas, who delivers bags of presents on December 5 and takes naughty kids back to Spain in the now empty bags. In some stories, the Zwarte Piets themselves were kidnapped as kids, and the kidnapped kids make up the next generation of Zwarte Piets. In Switzerland, the corresponding figure is known as Schmutzli (derived from Butzli) in German, or Père Fouettard in French. A similar figure, Krampus, appears in the folklore of Alpine countries, sometimes depicted with a sack or washtub to carry children away. In Bulgaria, children are sometimes told that a dark scary monster-like person called  (which comes from "", meaning a sack, so his name means "Man with a sack") will come and kidnap them with his large sack if they misbehave. He can be seen as the antipode of the Christmas figure Santa Claus (corresponding to Father Christmas). In Haiti, the Tonton Macoute is a giant, and a counterpart of Father Christmas, renowned for abducting bad children by putting them in his knapsack. During the dictatorship of Papa Doc Duvalier, certain Haitian secret policemen were given the name Tontons Macoutes because they were said also to make people disappear.

See also

References

Shapeshifting
Latin American folklore
Spanish legendary creatures
Spanish folklore
Brazilian folklore
Haitian folklore
Christmas characters
Bogeymen